Zalog pri Škofljici is a settlement south of Škofljica in central Slovenia. The Municipality of Škofljica is part of the traditional region of Lower Carniola and is now included in the Central Slovenia Statistical Region.

Name
The name of the settlement was changed from Zalog to Zalog pri Škofljici in 1955. In the past it was known as Saloch in German.

Cultural heritage

A small chapel-shrine in the settlement, named the French Chapel-Shrine, was erected in the 19th century (by tradition, in 1813) in memory of French soldiers who died in the Combat at St. Marein during the Napoleonic campaign in the Balkans.

References

External links

Zalog pri Škofljici on Geopedia

Populated places in the Municipality of Škofljica